The People's Action Party (abbreviation: PAP) is a major conservative centre-right political party in Singapore and is one of the three contemporary political parties represented in Parliament, alongside the opposition Workers' Party (WP) and Progress Singapore Party (PSP).

Initially founded as a traditional centre-left party in 1954, the leftist faction was soon expelled from the party in 1961 by Lee Kuan Yew in the midst of Singapore's merger with Malaysia, desiring to move the party's ideology towards the centre after its first electoral victory in 1959. Beginning in the 1960s, the party henceforth began to move towards the centre-right. Following the 1965 agreement which led to Singapore's expulsion from the Malaysian federation, almost the entire opposition except for the WP boycotted the following elections in 1968 in response to their initial incredulity towards independence, thereafter allowing the PAP the opportunity to exercise exclusivity over its governance of national institutions and become the largest political party in the country.

From 1965 to 1981, the PAP was the only political force represented in Parliament until it saw its first electoral defeat to the WP at a by-election in the constituency of Anson. Nevertheless, the PAP has not seen its hegemony effectively threatened and has always exceeded 60% of the votes and 80% of the seats in all subsequent elections. The PAP is the longest, uninterrupted governing party among multiparty parliamentary democracies in the world at 63 years as of 2022, and the second in history after Mexico's Institutional Revolutionary Party (PRI) which led for 71 years from 1929 to 2000.

Positioned on the centre-right of Singapore politics, the PAP is ideologically socially conservative and economically liberal. The party generally favours free-market economics, having turned Singapore's economy into one of the world's freest and most open, but has at times engaged in state interventionism reminiscent of welfare capitalist policies. Notably, since Singapore’s independence in 1965, the party has also supported the creation of state-owned enterprises, known within Singapore as Government-linked Corporations (GLCs), in order to jumpstart industrialisation, spearhead economic development and lead to economic growth (primarily job creation) in various sectors of the Singaporean economy as there was a lack of private sector funds and expertise, particularly in the early years of nationhood. Socially, it supports communitarianism and  civic nationalism, with the cohesion of the country's main ethnic groups of the Chinese, Malay and Indian into a united Singaporean national identity forming many of its policies. On foreign policy, it favours maintaining a strong and robust military, serving as a purportedly indispensable guarantor of the country's continued sovereignty within the context of its strategic position for international finance and trade.

History 

Lee Kuan Yew, Toh Chin Chye and Goh Keng Swee were involved in the Malayan Forum, a London-based student activist group that was against colonial rule in Malaya in the 1940s and early 1950s. Upon returning to Singapore, the group met regularly to discuss approaches to attain independence in Malayan territories and started looking for like-minded individuals to start a political party. Journalist S. Rajaratnam was introduced to Lee by Goh. Lee was also introduced to several English-educated left-wing students and Chinese-educated union and student leaders while working on the Fajar sedition trial and the National Service riot case.

Formation
The PAP was officially registered as a political party on 21 November 1954. Convenors of the party include a group of trade unionists, lawyers and journalists such as Lee Kuan Yew, Abdul Samad Ismail, Toh Chin Chye, Devan Nair, S. Rajaratnam, Chan Chiaw Thor, Fong Swee Suan, Tann Wee Keng and Tann Wee Tiong. The political party was led by Lee Kuan Yew as its secretary-general, with Toh Chin Chye as its founding chairman. Other party officers include Tann Wee Tiong, Lee Gek Seng, Ong Eng Guan and Tann Wee Keng.

The PAP first contested the 1955 general election in which 25 of 32 seats in the legislature were up for election. In this election, the PAP's four candidates gained much support from the trade union members and student groups such as the University Socialist Club, who canvassed for them. The party won three seats, one by its leader Lee Kuan Yew for the Tanjong Pagar division and one by PAP co-founder Lim Chin Siong for the Bukit Timah division. Then 22 years old unionist Lim Chin Siong was and remained the youngest Assemblyman ever to be elected to office. The election was won by the Labour Front headed by David Marshall.

In April 1956, Lim and Lee represented the PAP at the London Constitutional Talks along with Chief Minister David Marshall which ended in failure as the British declined to grant Singapore internal self-government. On 7 June 1956, Marshall, disappointed with the constitutional talks, stepped down as Chief Minister as he had pledged to do so earlier if self-governance was not achieved. He was replaced by Lim Yew Hock, another Labour Front member. Lim pursued a largely anti-communist campaign and managed to convince the British to make a definite plan for self-government. The Constitution of Singapore was revised accordingly in 1958, replacing the Rendel Constitution with one that granted Singapore self-government and the ability for its own population to fully elect its Legislative Assembly.

PAP and left-wing members who were communists were criticised for inciting riots in the mid-1950s. Lim Chin Siong, Fong Swee Suan and Devan Nair as well as several unionists were detained by the police after the Chinese middle schools riots. Lim Chin Siong was placed under solitary confinement for close to a year, away from his other PAP colleagues, as they were placed in the Medium Security Prison (MSP) instead.

The number of PAP members imprisoned rose in August 1957, when PAP members from the trade unions (viewed as "communist or pro-communist") won half the seats in the Central Executive Committee (CEC). The "moderate" CEC members, including Lee Kuan Yew, Toh Chin Chye and others, refused to take their appointments in the CEC. Yew Hock's government again made a sweeping round of arrests, imprisoning all the "communist" members, before the "moderates" re-assumed their office.

Following this, the PAP decided to re-assert ties with the labour faction of Singapore in the hope of securing the votes of working-class Chinese Singaporeans, many of whom were supporters of the jailed unionists. Lee Kuan Yew convinced the incarcerated union leaders to sign documents to state their support for the party and its policies, promising to release the jailed members of the PAP when the party came to power in the next elections. Ex-Barisan Sosialis member Tan Jing Quee claims that Lee was secretly in collusion with the British to stop Lim Chin Siong and the labour supporters from attaining power because of their huge popularity. Quee also states that Lim Yew Hock deliberately provoked the students into rioting and then had the labour leaders arrested.  Greg Poulgrain of Griffiths University argued that "Lee Kuan Yew was secretly a party with Lim Yew Hock in urging the Colonial Secretary to impose the subversives ban in making it illegal for former political detainees to stand for election". Lee Kuan Yew eventually accused Lim Chin Siong and his supporters of being communists working for the Communist United Front, but evidence of Lim being a communist cadre was a matter of debate as many documents have yet to be declassified.

First years in government
The PAP eventually won the 1959 general election under Lee Kuan Yew's leadership. The election was also the first one to produce a fully elected parliament and a cabinet wielding powers of full internal self-government. The party has won a majority of seats in every general election since then. Lee, who became the first Prime Minister, requested for the release of the PAP left-wing members to form the new cabinet.

Great Split of 1961

In 1961, disagreements on the proposed merger plan to form Malaysia and long-standing internal party power struggle led to the split of the left-wing group from the PAP.

Although the "Communist" faction had been frozen out of ever taking over the PAP, other problems had begun to arise internally. Ong Eng Guan, the former Mayor of the City Council after PAP's victory in the 1957 Singapore City Council election, presented a set of "16 Resolutions" to revisit some issues previously explored by Chin Siong's faction of the PAP: abolishing the PPSO, revising the Constitution, and changing the method of selecting cadre members.

Although Ong's 16 Resolutions originated from the left-wing faction led by Lim Chin Siong, that faction had only reluctantly asked the PAP leadership to clarify its position on them, as they still thought that the party with Lee Kuan Yew at the helm was a better alternative than Ong who was regarded as mercurial and a tyrant. However, Lee took the stance taken by the left-wing PAP members as a lack of confidence in his leadership. This issue caused a rift between the "moderate" PAP members (led by Lee) and the "left-wing" faction (led by Lim).

Ong was then expelled, and he resigned his Assembly seat to challenge the government to a by-election in Hong Lim in April 1961, where he won 73.3% of the vote. This was despite the fact that Lee Kuan Yew had made a secret alliance with Fong Chong Pik, the leader of the Communist Party of Malaya (CPM), to get the CPM cadres to support the PAP in the by-election.

Barisan Sosialis
The breakaway group of members formed the Barisan Sosialis with Lim Chin Siong as secretary-general. Aside from the Chinese union leaders, lawyers Thampoe Thamby Rajah and Tann Wee Tiong, several members from the University Socialist Club such as James Puthucheary and Poh Soo Kai joined the party. 35 of 51 branches of the PAP and 19 of 23 branch secretaries defected to Barisan.

Merger years 1963–1965

After gaining independence from Britain, Singapore joined the federation of Malaysia in 1963. Although the PAP was the ruling party in the state of Singapore, the PAP functioned as an opposition party at the federal level in the larger Malaysian political landscape. At that time and until the 2018 general election, the federal government in Kuala Lumpur was controlled by a coalition led by the United Malays National Organisation (UMNO). However, the prospect that the PAP might rule Malaysia agitated UMNO. The PAP's decision to contest federal parliamentary seats outside Singapore and the UMNO decision to contest seats within Singapore breached an unspoken agreement to respect each other's spheres of influence and aggravated PAP–UMNO relations. The clash of personalities between PAP leader Lee Kuan Yew and Malaysian Prime Minister Tunku Abdul Rahman resulted in a crisis and led to Rahman forcing Singapore to leave Malaysia on 9 August 1965. Upon independence, the nascent People's Action Party of Malaya, which had been registered in Malaysia on 10 March 1964, had its registration cancelled on 9 September 1965, just a month after Singapore's exit. Those with the now non-existent party applied to register People's Action Party, Malaya which was again rejected by the Malaysian government, before settling with the Democratic Action Party.

Post-independence, 1965 to present

The PAP has held an overwhelming majority of seats in the Parliament of Singapore since 1966, when the opposition Barisan Sosialis (Socialist Front) resigned from Parliament after winning 13 seats following the 1963 general election, which took place months after a number of their leaders had been arrested in Operation Coldstore based on accusations of being communists. It subsequently achieved a monopoly in an expanding parliament (winning every parliamentary seat) for the next four elections (1968, 1972, 1976 and 1980). Opposition parties returned to the legislature at a 1981 by-election. The 1984 general election was the first election in 21 years in which opposition parties won seats. From then until 2006, the PAP faced four opposition MPs at most.  Opposition parties did not win more than four parliamentary seats from 1984 until 2011 when the Workers' Party won six seats and took away a Group Representation Constituency (GRC) for the first time for any opposition party.

Even so, it still holds a supermajority in the legislature, to the point that Singapore is effectively a dominant party system. With its supermajority, the PAP has always had the ability to amend the Constitution of Singapore without much obstruction, including the introduction of multi-member constituencies under the Group representation constituency (GRC) system or Nominated Member of Parliament (NMPs), which has helped strengthened the government's dominance and control of Parliament.

Leadership transitions
The longtime governing party of Singapore, spans both past and present, but notably occurred in the mid-1980s where the first generation of PAP leaders in the CEC and the Cabinet of Singapore ceded power to a second generation of leaders.

First to second generation
By 1984, the "old guard" (first generation of party leaders) had been governing Singapore for approximately a quarter of a century. Aging leadership was a key concern, and the Prime Minister of Singapore, Lee Kuan Yew sought to groom younger leaders. In a speech on 29 September 1984, Lee argued that though the first generation of leaders was still "alert and fully in charge", to hang on to power until they had become feeble would allow power to be wrested from them, with no say in who their successors were.

On 30 September, at the Ordinary Party Conference, power was transferred to the second generation of leaders, who were elected to the Central Executive Committee in place of all the old CEC members; of the 14-member CEC, only Lee Kuan Yew remained the only "old guard" leader.

According to a report to the Library of Congress, the old guard were confident in their "rectitude" and discretion in using their extensive political powers for Singapore's common good, but were not as confident in the next generation in doing so. Various limits on executive power were considered, in order to minimise the chances of corruption. These included a popularly elected President of Singapore with substantial, nonceremonial powers. This particular reform was enacted with a constitutional amendment in 1991.

The old guard also sought to eschew the use of PAP as a central political institution, seeking to "depoliticise" and disperse power among society, and sought to include low-level community leaders in government. A policy of cross-fertilisation was enacted: exchange of leaders, "elites" and talent would take place between private and government sectors, civilian and military segments of society, and between the party and the National Trades Union Congress.

Second to third generation
The next generation of leaders in the late 1980s was split between the factions of then Brigadier General Lee Hsien Loong and the older, more-experienced Goh Chok Tong. Lee Hsien Loong was supported by bureaucrats in the Ministry of Defence and army colleagues in the Singapore Armed Forces; Goh Chok Tong had more influence in the Singapore Civil Service, the Cabinet and the government-linked corporations.

Lee Kuan Yew himself remained Prime Minister and in the CEC until 1990, when he stepped down in favour of Goh Chok Tong as PM. Lee Hsien Loong became PM in 2004.

Third to fourth generation
On 23 November 2018, fourth-generation leadership members, then–Minister for Finance Heng Swee Keat and then–Minister for Trade and Industry Chan Chun Sing were elected as the First and Second Assistant Secretaries-General respectively, the second and third highest positions of the party. They had replaced then - Assistant Secretary-Generals Teo Chee Hean and Tharman Shanmugaratnam. A significant step of the leadership transition from the third-generation leaders to the fourth-generation leaders.

On 1 May 2019, Heng Swee Keat was appointed the new and sole Deputy Prime Minister, replacing Teo and Tharman. He was then widely seen as the 4th and next Prime Minister and Secretary-General of PAP succeeding incumbent Lee Hsien Loong. However on 8 April 2021, Heng surprisingly announced he would step down as the fourth-generation leader and step aside to pave way for younger and healthier leaders to take over the leadership and stressed that health and age as concerns of this decision. After his decision, several Cabinet members were seen as the possible candidates to succeed Heng, ranging from Minister for Finance Lawrence Wong, Minister for Health Ong Ye Kung, Minister for Education Chan Chun Sing.

On 14 April 2022, Finance Minister Lawrence Wong was selected as the new leader of the PAP's fourth-generation (4G) team, succeeding Deputy Prime Minister Heng Swee Keat who had stepped down as 4G leader. Wong received an "overwhelming majority" of support in the consultation process, surpassing that of other nominees.  His candidacy was unanimously endorsed by the cabinet and subsequently, by the PAP MPs at a party caucus on 14 April.

Organisation 

During its initial years, the party had adopted a traditional Leninist form of party organisation, together with a vanguard cadre from its labour-leaning faction. The PAP Executive later expelled the leftist faction in 1961, bringing the ideological basis of the party into the centre and later in the 1960s moving further to the right. 

In the beginning, there were about 500 so-called temporary cadres appointed, however the current number of cadres is unknown, with the register of cadres being kept confidential. In 1988, Wong Kan Seng revealed that there were more than 1,000 cadres.

Cadre members have the right to attend party conferences and to vote for and elect and to be elected into the Central Executive Committee (CEC), the pinnacle of party leaders. 

To become a cadre, a party member must be first nominated by the MP in their branch. The candidate will then undergo three sessions of interview, each with four to five ministers or MPs and the appointment is then made by the CEC. About 100 candidates are nominated each year.

Central Executive Committee and Secretary-General
Political power in the party is concentrated in the CEC, led by the secretary-general. The secretary-general of the PAP is the leader of the party. Due to PAP's electoral victories in every general election since 1959, the prime minister of Singapore has been by convention the secretary-general of the PAP since 1959. Key appointments in the CEC are usually Cabinet members.

From 1957 onward, the rules laid down that the outgoing CEC should recommend a list of candidates from which the cadre members can then vote for the next CEC. This has recently changed so that the CEC nominates eight members and the party caucus selects the remaining ten.

Historically, the position of Secretary-General was not considered for the office of Prime Minister, but rather the Central Executive Committee held an election to choose the prime minister. There was a contest between PAP Secretary-General Lee Kuan Yew and PAP Treasurer Ong Eng Guan, prior to 1959. Lee subsequently won the leadership and was inaugurated as the first prime minister of Singapore.

HQ Executive Committee
The next lower level committee is the HQ Executive Committee (HQ EXCO) which performs the party's administration and oversees 14 sub-committees. 

The sub-committees are the following:
 Branch Appointments and Relations
 Constituency Relations
 Information and Feedback
 New Media
 Malay Affairs
 Membership Recruitment and Cadre Selection
 PAP Awards
 Political Education
 Publicity and Publication
 Social and Recreational
 Women's Wing (WW)
 Young PAP (YP)
 PAP Seniors Group (PAP.SG)
 PAP Policy Forum (PPF)

Young PAP and internet presence
The Young PAP is the youth-wing of the party, serving as a youth organisation for young adults and students in Singapore who support the PAP and have an interest in politics. The incumbent chairman of the youth-wing is Janil Puthucheary. 

The YP's predecessor, the PAP Youth Committee was established in 1986, under Lee Hsien Loong's tenure as Chairman, then a Singapore Armed Forces Brigadier-General. All PAP members under the age of 35 were grouped under the Youth Committee. 

In 1993, the Youth Committee was renamed the Young PAP. In an effort to attract members, then Chairman George Yeo, said that people joining the YP could take positions different from central party leadership. The age limit was raised from 35 to 40. Memberships are issued through the PAP branches under each constituency in Singapore. 

By 2005, the committee had grown to more than 6,000 members. In 2010, then Vice-Chairman Zaqy Mohamad said the YP attracts over 1200 new members that year, an increase on the 1000 new members in 2009.

Since 1995, the youth-wing of the PAP has had an internet presence that aims to "correct 'misinformation' about Singapore politics or culture". Young PAP is also in charge of several online websites since 1995 to create an online presence for the party, under the urging of then Minister for Information and the Arts George Yeo. 

In February 2007, it was reported by The Straits Times that the PAP's new media committee chaired by Minister Ng Eng Hen, had initiated an effort to counter critics anonymously on the Internet "as it was necessary for the PAP to have a voice on cyberspace". 

The initiative was divided by two sub-committees, one of which was in charge of strategising the campaigns and is co-headed by Minister Lui Tuck Yew and MP Zaqy Mohamad. The other sub-committee—new media capabilities group led by MPs Baey Yam Keng and Josephine Teo executed the strategies. The initiative was set up after the 2006 general election and also included around 20 IT-savvy PAP activists. 

After popular forum Sintercom was shut down in 2001, the Young PAP offered their own forum for moderated discussions. They have since set up various blogs and social media accounts with multimedia content to engage the masses.

Ideology

Asian democracy
The PAP has often set forth the idea of Asian democracy and values, drawing from a notion of Asian culture and Confucianism to construct ideological bulwarks as an alternative to Western democracy. Nevertheless, the presence of many aspects of liberal democracy in Singapore's public policy exists, such as the recognition of democratic institutions and the rule of law. Professor Hussin Mutalib from the National University of Singapore (NUS) opines that for Lee Kuan Yew, "Singapore would be better off without Western-style liberal democracy".

Consequently, the governance of the PAP has occasionally been characterised by some observers especially in the West as relatively "semi-authoritarian" or "nanny-like" by "liberal democratic standards", with the introduction of unique laws such as banning the sales of chewing gum in 1992 for cleanliness purposes.

According to Kenneth Paul Tan from the NUS, it proclaimed that the reason many Singaporeans continue to vote for the PAP are due to the fact that economic considerations, pragmatism and stability triumphs over accountability and checks and balances by opposition parties. It has also been noted that despite the PAP having effective control over the state apparatus, they have "proven themselves" to Singaporeans as being much more transparent than risk having an alternative party govern the country; Singapore has been considered as being one of the least corrupt countries in the world by international observers such as Transparency International.

Indeed, many political observers has added that many Singaporeans willingly accept this arrangement; by conceding some rights of personal liberty, in return, the party that has run Singapore since its founding, delivers progress and predictability. The PAP has won significant genuine support amongst the people for rapidly developing the country, as well as overseeing economic success and stability after the often turbulent periods prior to its independence. Accordingly, this has led many Singaporeans into becoming highly risk-averse in voting for other parties due to their perception that it may led to a decreased prosperity of the country.

Economic policies

The party economic ideology has always accepted the need for some welfare spending, and pragmatic economic interventionism. However, free-market policies have been popular since the 1980s as part of the wider implementation of a meritocracy in civil society and Singapore frequently ranks extremely highly on indices of economic freedom published by economically liberal organisations such as the World Bank and the International Monetary Fund. Singapore is also the only Asian country with the top AAA sovereign rating from the "Big Three" credit rating agencies of S&P, Moody's and Fitch.

Lee Kuan Yew once said in 1992: "Through Hong Kong watching, I concluded that state welfare and subsidies blunted the individual's drive to succeed. I watched with amazement the ease with which Hong Kong workers adjusted their salaries upwards in boom times and downwards in recessions. I resolved to reverse course on the welfare policies which my party had inherited or copied from British Labour Party policies".

Notably, since Singapore’s independence in 1965, the party has also supported the creation of state-owned enterprises, known within Singapore as Government-linked Corporations (GLCs), in order to jumpstart industrialisation, spearhead economic development and lead to economic growth (primarily job creation) in various sectors of the Singaporean economy as there was a lack of private sector funds and expertise, particularly in the early years of nationhood. Various GLCs were formed to pursue strategic sectors such as in ship building and repair (Sembcorp Marine, Keppel Corporation), aviation and defence (Singapore Airlines, ST Engineering), telecommunications (Singtel), real estate (CapitaLand) and development finance (DBS Bank) amongst others. In addition, various GLCs were set up as private-public partnerships, notable as joint ventures or strategic alliances with foreign companies or investors with relevant expertise, particularly in the petrochemicals and oil refining industries.

Social policies
Since the early years of the PAP's rule, the idea of survival has been a central theme of Singaporean politics. According to Diane Mauzy and R. S. Milne, most analysts of Singapore have discerned four major ideologies of the PAP, namely pragmatism, meritocracy, multiracialism and Asian values or communitarianism.

In January 1991, the PAP introduced the White Paper on Shared Values which tried to create a national ideology and institutionalise Asian values.

At an Institute of Policy Studies dialogue held on 2 July 2015, Prime Minister Lee Hsien Loong spoke about the need to maintain a Jeffersonian natural aristocracy in the system to instill a culture of respect and to avoid anarchy.

Views on other ideologies
The party is deeply suspicious of communist political ideologies despite a brief joint alliance with the pro-labour co-founders of the PAP during the party's early years, who were eventually accused of being communists. In 2015, the party was seen by some observers to have adopted a left-of-centre tack in certain areas in order to remain electorally dominant.

The socialism practised by the PAP during its first few decades in power was of a pragmatic kind as characterised by the party's rejection of nationalisation. According to Chan Heng Chee, by the late 1970s the intellectual credo of the government rested explicitly upon a philosophy of self-reliance, similar to the rugged individualism of the American brand of capitalism. Despite this, the PAP still claimed to be a socialist party, pointing out its regulation of the private sector, activist intervention in the economy and social policies as evidence of this. In 1976, the PAP resigned from the Socialist International, after the Dutch Labour Party had proposed to expel the PAP, on charges of violation of human rights and indefinite detention of political prisoners without trial.

Symbolism
The PAP symbol (which is a red thunderbolt and blue circle on white) stands for action inside multicultural unity. It also appears on party flags on parades. PAP members at party rallies have customarily worn a uniform of white shirts and white trousers which symbolises incorruptibility and purity of the party's ideologies of the government.

Leadership

List of chairmen

List of secretaries-general

Central Executive Committee
As of 26 November 2022, the Central Executive Committee comprises the following members:

Current Members of Parliament

Single Member Constituency

4 Member Group Constituency

5 Member Group Constituency

Electoral history

Legislative Assembly

 Legislative Assembly by-elections

Malaysian Parliament

Parliament

 Parliamentary by-elections

See also

 PAP Community Foundation
 Party Whip of the People's Action Party
 Politics of Singapore
 List of political parties in Singapore

References

Citations

Sources 
 Books

 Goh, Cheng Teik (1994). Malaysia: Beyond Communal Politics. Pelanduk Publications. .
 
 

 Online sources

 "Singapore – People's Action Party" . Country Studies Series by the Federal Research Division of the Library of Congress. Retrieved 15 July 2020.
 James Chin, "The 2015 Singapore Swing: Depoliticised Polity and the Kiasi/Kiasu Voter" . The Round Table, Vol. 105, Iss. 2, 2016. .

External links 

 Official website

Political parties in Asia
Political parties in Singapore
Political parties established in 1954
Politics of Singapore
1954 establishments in Singapore
Conservative parties in Asia
Conservative parties in Singapore
Conservative parties in Southeast Asia
Social conservative parties
Anti-communist parties